Clara Morgane ( is a French singer and former pornographic film actress.

Biography

Clara Morgane first became notable as a porn star : she started making movies with her boyfriend Greg Centauro and Pierre Piot in 2000 and, after a few amateur shoots, became a professional actress. She stopped her porn career after only two years and seven movies, eventually ending her relationship with Centauro who did not wish to leave the porn industry. In 2001, she started hosting on Canal+ Le Journal du hard, a magazine dedicated to the industry. She hosted it for seven years.

In 2003, she published her first autobiography, Sex Star.

Singing career
In 2007, she started a singing career. Rudy Lansard and Abdel Maalikoom produced her first song J'Aime. Her debut album, DéCLARAtions was released 18 June 2007, with a mixture of funk, hip-hop and R'n'B. Clara Morgane wrote the lyrics for all the songs. The first single, J'Aime featuring rapper Lord Kossity, and Sexy Girl have been available online since 26 March 2007.

Danse avec les stars

In 2019, she participated in the tenth season of Danse avec les stars – the French version of Dancing with the Stars. She was partnered with professional dancer Maxime Dereymez. On October 26, 2019, they were eliminated finishing 6th out of 10 contestants.

In week 3, each couple have an imposed figure, if they succeed, they get 5 bonus points.

Titles and awards
She received a Hot d'Or Award for "Best French Starlet" in 2001.

She was elected the top French and eighth sexiest woman in the world by the French edition of the magazine FHM.

Discography

Album
 2007: DéCLARAtions (released 18 June)
 2010: Nuits Blanches (released 29 November)
 2014: So Excited (released 10 October)

Singles
 J'Aime (duo with Lord Kossity) (2007)
 Sexy Girl (2007)
 Nous Deux (2008)
 Le Diable au Corps (2010)
 IL (2011)
 Good Time (2011)
 Je t'Adore (2012)
 Comme Un Boomerang (2012)
 I’m so Excited (2014)
 Eve (2015)
 Mon Étage  (2015)
 Ouvre (2016)

Music videos
 J'Aime
 Sexy Girl
 Nous Deux
 Nous Deux (remix) (by Hakimakli)
 Le Diable au Corps
 Beautiful Things (Tiesto) (2005)
 IL (2011)
 Good Time (2011)
 Good Time (acoustique) (2011)
 Vous/Mademoiselle X (2011)
 Je t'Adore (2012)
 Comme Un Boomerang (2012)
 Ce qu’il me faut (2013)
 I’m so Excited (2014)
 Eve (2015)
 Mon Étage  (2015)
 Ouvre (2016)
 Rouge (2017)
 Travesti (2021)

Publications
  Sex Star, Adcan Edition, 2003, 
  Kâma Sûtra, Adcan Edition, 2004, illustrated

Companies
 Sarl Péché Capital Media (PCM) – created 2003-12-06
 Sarl M Holding – created 2007-04-12

Further reading
  Clara Morgane (2003). Sex Star – Adcan Edition –

Notes and references

External links

 
 
 

Year of birth missing (living people)
French pornographic film actresses
Living people
Penthouse Pets
21st-century French women singers